Cope's giant salamander (Dicamptodon copei) is a species of salamander in the family Dicamptodontidae, the Pacific giant salamanders. It is native to Washington and Oregon in the Pacific Northwest region of the United States.

Description
This species up to 19.5 centimeters in length. It exhibits neoteny rarely undergoing metamorphosis to the adult form, and it resembles the larvae of similar salamander species. It usually becomes sexually, but not physically, mature. It is gold and brown in color. The costal grooves are inconspicuous. It has a rounded snout and the laterally compressed, finlike tail of a typical larva. It retains its gills.

Behavior 
Little is known about the species' habitat requirements, but it has been found in mountains pools and streams. It feeds on smaller animals, such as fish and amphibians and their eggs, including the larvae of its own species.

The female lays a clutch of around 50 and up to 115 eggs in wet habitat near water bodies. She guards them and possibly defends them aggressively.

Conservation
The range of this species extends from the Olympic Peninsula to northern Oregon. Its populations are likely stable to slightly declining. Threats include water temperature change and silt from nearby logging operations.

References

Dicamptodon
Amphibians of the United States
Endemic fauna of the United States
Amphibians described in 1970
Natural history of Washington (state)
Natural history of Oregon
Taxonomy articles created by Polbot